The Souvenir napoléonien, founded in 1937, is an association which promotes the historical study of the Napoleonic era. Its full name is the Société française d'histoire napoléonienne.

Background 
First established in the year 1937 by Eugénie Gal, a great-great-niece of Marshal Suchet, the Souvenir napoléonien was recognized as a benevolent association by a French decree dated 5 November 1982.
The society studies and makes known the history of the First and Second French Empires, from the time of the French Revolution, the imperial family, and the institutions, places, and people who were part of this history. For this purpose, it organizes a wide variety of events, such as conferences, seminars, study visits, and commemorations, at the international, national and regional levels, both in France and abroad.

The society works closely with the Fondation Napoléon, from which it receives financial support for the publication of its magazine, the Revue du souvenir napoléonien.

Structure
The officers of the Souvenir napoléonien are a President, an Honorary President, three Vice-Presidents, a Treasurer and a Deputy Treasurer. The governing body is called the Steering Committee. There is also a General Secretary and an editor-in-chief of the magazine.

In France and abroad, delegates are tasked with the organization of venues and conferences. The delegations in France are as follows: Nord-Pas-de-Calais, Picardy, Normandy, Brittany, Paris and Île-de-France, Champagne-Ardenne, Lorraine, Alsace, Loire Valley, Berry, Burgundy, Franche-Comté, Poitou-Charentes, Limousin-Quercy, Auvergne, Lyonnais, Dauphiné-Savoie, Aquitaine, Midi-Pyrénées, Languedoc-Roussillon, Provence-Alpes-Côte d'Azur, Nice Alpes-Maritimes, and Corsica.

The delegations abroad are: Northern Italy, Rome and Central Italy, Belgium, Sweden and Switzerland. In addition, there are overseas correspondents for Montreal, Bogota, Vienna, and the United Kingdom.

Library 
The Souvenir napoléonien has a library which was initially established with about five hundred books from the library of Baron Jean Thiry, bequeathed to the society by the historian's children. This library is constantly expanded by donations from the society's members and from authors and publishers, as well as by purchases, and is available for the use of members of the association and of students in a building at 82 rue de Monceau, Paris.

The library contains the archive of the Revue du Souvenir napoléonien magazine, starting from issue number 233 of December 1967.

The Revue du Souvenir napoléonien 
Many historians, including Thierry Lentz, Michel Wilmot, Maurice Bernard-Catinat, Jacques-Olivier Boudon, and Jean Étèvenaux, have contributed to the society's magazine Revue du Souvenir napoléonien on topics relating to the Napoleonic era, from the Directoire to the Second French Empire.

Notes and references

External links
 
 napoleonica.org, Napoleonic archives from the Fondation Napoléon
 Internet site of the Fondation Napoléon

French Revolution
First French Empire
Napoleonic Wars
Second French Empire
Historical societies of France
Organizations established in 1937
Organizations based in Paris